Tivoli Hall is a complex of two multi-purpose indoor sports arenas in the Tivoli City Park in Ljubljana, the capital of Slovenia. The complex was opened in 1965. The larger, ice hockey arena has a seating capacity of 7,000 people and is the home of HK Olimpija ice hockey club. During the EuroBasket 2013, the capacity was adjusted to 5,600.

The smaller basketball hall has a capacity for 4,500 spectators and is the secondary home venue of the basketball team KK Cedevita Olimpija.

Events
Regular sporting events include:
HK Olimpija (ice hockey)
KK Cedevita Olimpija (basketball); secondary home venue after Arena Stožice
Ilirija (basketball); since the 2017–18 season
RK Olimpija (handball)
ACH Volley (volleyball)

One-time sporting events include:
1965 World Table Tennis Championships
1970 FIBA World Championship, the final round
1970 World Figure Skating Championships
1970 World Artistic Gymnastics Championships
1982 World Weightlifting Championships
2004 European Men's Handball Championship
Ice Hockey World Championships:
1966 Ice Hockey World Championships – Group A
1969 Ice Hockey World Championships – Group B
1974 Ice Hockey World Championships – Group B
1991 Men's Ice Hockey World Championships – Group B
1993 Men's Ice Hockey World Championships – Group C
1998 Men's Ice Hockey World Championships – Group B
2001 Men's Ice Hockey World Championships – Division I
2007 Men's Ice Hockey World Championships – Division I
2010 Men's Ice Hockey World Championships – Division I
2022 Men's Ice Hockey World Championships – Division I
2013 FIBA EuroBasket 2013, Group A

Other activities

Apart from being a sporting venue, Tivoli Hall also hosts numerous concerts, musicals and other shows.

Concerts

Louis Armstrong & The All Stars – April 4, 1965
Blood, Sweat & Tears – June 1970
Christie – October 1, 1971
Ray Charles – September 27, 1972
Jethro Tull – April 15, 1975 and May 11, 2000
Ike & Tina Turner - November 2, 1974
Tina Turner - November 15, 1975
Frank Zappa – November 22, 1975
Procol Harum – January 30, 1976
Suzi Quatro – February 27, 1976
Cat Stevens – May 14, 1976
Queen – February 7, 1979
Gillan – December 7, 1979
Lene Lovich - April 4, 1980
Motörhead – April 27–28, 1989, December 10, 2012
Iron Maiden – August 19, 1984, September 12, 1986, and January 21, 1996
Uriah Heep – May 16, 1983
Dire Straits – May 13, 1985
The Pixies – September 24, 1988
Laibach – March 30, 1989
The Cure – May 24, 1989, with Shelleyan Orphan
Black Sabbath – September 27, 1989, with Axxis
Nirvana – February 27, 1994, with The Melvins
The Sisters of Mercy – March 11, 1991
Siouxsie and the Banshees – October 9, 1991
Faith No More – June 16, 1993 and November 19, 1997
The Ramones – October 10, 1994
Đorđe Balašević – November 14, 1994
The Beastie Boys – February 26, 1995, with Luscious Jackson
Simple Minds – October 19, 1995 and April 8, 2006
David Bowie – February 6, 1996
Green Day – March 23, 1996
The Sex Pistols – July 9, 1996
ZZ Top – March 12, 1997 and October 16, 2009
The Prodigy – October 31, 1997
NOFX – October 6, 1998
Bob Dylan – April 28, 1999 and June 13, 2010
Blondie – October 23, 1999, with The Flirt
Joe Cocker – November 7, 1999 and May 22, 2005
Rage Against the Machine – February 8, 2000, with The Asian Dub Foundation
Yes – March 20, 2000
Steve Vai and Eric Sardinas – April 13, 2000
Sting – May 14, 2000
Pearl Jam – June 19, 2000, with The Dismemberment Plan
HIM – November 12, 2000
The Offspring – January 28, 2001, with AFI
Melanie C – February 14, 2001
Michael Flatley's Lord of the Dance – April 24–26, 2001
Nick Cave & The Bad Seeds – June 3, 2001
Eros Ramazzotti – June 17, 2001 and November 19, 2009
Rammstein – June 10, 2002 and February 25, 2005, with Apocalyptica
Kosheen – February 22, 2003
Bryan Adams – April 22, 2003 and November 26, 2006
Simply Red – July 9, 2003, with Sinéad O'Connor and June 24, 2009
Deep Purple – December 5, 2003 and October 5, 2006
G3 – July 9, 2004
R.E.M. – January 17, 2005, with Brainstorm
Anastacia – February 19, 2005
Lou Reed – March 13, 2005 and March 13, 2006
Mark Knopfler – May 3, 2005
Ceca – May 20, 2005
Dream Theater – October 19, 2005, and October 31, 2009, with Opeth, Bigelf and Unexpect
Joan Baez – March 30, 2007
Zucchero – May 12, 2007
Il Divo – June 15, 2007 and March 27, 2009
Tori Amos – June 26, 2007, with Joshua Radin
P!nk – July 4–5, 2007
Bryan Ferry – October 10, 2007
Nightwish – March 4, 2008, with PAIN
Tribute to Bijelo Dugme – April 5, 2008
Katie Melua – April 27, 2008
John Fogerty – June 14, 2008
Status Quo – July 2, 2008
Seal – July 14, 2008
RBD – September 4–5 (twice on the 5th) and December 16, 2008
Iggy Pop & The Stooges – September 29, 2008, with The Psihomodo Pop
Jean Michel Jarre – November 7, 2008
Uriah Heep – December 13, 2008
Lepa Brena – March 21, 2009
Armin van Buuren and Rank 1 – October 23, 2009
Air – December 14, 2009, with We Fell to Earth
Michael Bolton – January 25, 2010
Chris Rea – February 22, 2010
50 Cent – March 3, 2010
Anahí – March 12, 2010
Billy Idol – June 24, 2010
Boy George – September 23, 2010
Smokie – February 2, 2012
Keane – October 29, 2012
Whitesnake – November 30, 2011
Brit Floyd – Tribute to Pink Floyd – November 9, 2012
Srebrna krila – November 30, 2012
Motörhead – December 10, 2012
Slash – February 8, 2013
Nelly Furtado – March 14, 2013
Nick Cave & the Bad Seeds – November 25, 2013
Dream Theater – February 4, 2014
Sticky Fingers – Tribute to Rolling Stones – February 14, 2014
Tadej Toš – Stand Up for Slovenija – March 26, 2015
Toto – July 2, 2015
Alice Cooper – June 12, 2016
Whitesnake – July 12, 2016

See also
 List of indoor arenas in Slovenia

References

External links

Official website

Indoor arenas in Slovenia
Indoor ice hockey venues in Slovenia
Sports venues in Ljubljana
Šiška District
Basketball venues in Slovenia
HDD Olimpija Ljubljana
Sports venues completed in 1965
hall
1965 establishments in Slovenia
Handball venues in Slovenia
KK Olimpija
Volleyball venues in Slovenia
20th-century architecture in Slovenia